Aechmea sucreana is a species of flowering plant in the genus Aechmea. This species is endemic to the State of Espírito Santo in eastern Brazil.

References

sucreana
Flora of Brazil
Plants described in 2005